DCSC may refer to:
Defense Construction Supply Center
Delphi Community School Corporation
Dimension Cavalry Southern Cross